Tel Jezreel ( Yīzrə‘e’l, "God will sow") is an archaeological site in the eastern Jezreel Valley in northern Israel. The city of Jezreel served as a main fortress of the Kingdom of Israel under king Ahab in the 9th century BCE.

Biblical references

Prior to the division of the United Kingdom of Israel, the city was the hometown of Ahinoam, second wife of King David, Michal, Saul's daughter, being the first, Ahinoam being his second, and Abigail, widow of Nabal, being his third. According to the First Book of Kings, the royal palace of King Ahab, "one of the most famous of the royal residences of the kings of Israel", was in Jezreel, adjacent to the vineyard of Naboth. Ahab's capital remained in Samaria.

Jezreel is around 50 km from Mount Carmel.

They comply, throwing her out the window. They left her in the street where she was eaten by dogs. Only Jezebel's skull, feet, and hands remained.

In  Jehu orders the death of 70 descendants of Ahab, and has their heads sent to the new king in Jezreel and piled up in "two heaps at the gate entrance."

Jezreel is also mentioned in the book of Hosea where God commands Hosea to name his son "Jezreel, because I will soon punish the house of Jehu for the massacre at Jezreel, and I will put an end to the kingdom of Israel" (Hosea 1:4). God also tells Hosea as to a future event, "I will even betroth thee unto me in faithfulness: and thou shalt know the Lord. And it shall come to pass in that day, I will hear, saith the Lord, I will hear the heavens, and they shall hear the earth; And the earth shall hear the corn, and the wine, and the oil; and they shall hear Jezreel.". Hosea also mentions, "In that day I will break Israel’s bow in the Valley of Jezreel.".

History
The "breathtaking views" that the site commands to the north and east are considered to have been of strategic importance during the Bronze and Iron Ages because the commercial and military highway from Egypt to Syria and Mesopotamia passed through Megiddo, the Jezreel Valley, and Beth Shean.

Chalcolithic and Bronze Age period 
During the excavations, archaeologists collected pottery and other findings scattered all over the site. The earliest archaeological findings in the site date to the Wadi Raba culture of the 5th millennium BCE. Based on the findings, the site was inhabited as an unfortified settlement throughout the entire Bronze Age period.

Iron Age
Water was supplied by cisterns inside the walls and by the spring of 'En Jezreel northeast of the fortress. Because of the strategic location, ample water supply, and excellent grazing in the Jezreel Valley, archaeologists David Ussishkin and John Woodhead believe that Jezreel was the base for King Ahab's chariot corps and cavalry.

Jezreel was a 9th-century BCE fortress possibly built during the reign of King Omri but certainly active in the reigns of King Ahab and his consort Queen Jezebel and their son King Jehoram.  It was destroyed soon afterward,  possibly by the Arameans in the late 9th-century. The pottery found in the fortress during the dig all dates to this brief period.

Late Roman/Early Byzantine period
The anonymous Bordeaux Pilgrim who visited the site in 333 CE calls it by its Latinised name, Stradela, a word derived from the Greek form Ésdráēla. The fourth-century Christian nun and pilgrim Egeria visited Jezreel and reported that "the tomb of Jezebel is stoned by everyone to this very day."

Byzantine period to 1948
Jezreel was the site of a Byzantine-era village, a Crusader-period village belonging to the Knights Templar, and a later Islamic period village named Zir'in (derived from the ancient name Jezreel). A "beautiful Crusader church still stands largely intact. Benjamin of Tudela visited Jezreel in 1165 CE and reports that a Jewish man "a dyer by profession" lived there. It was the site of a large Ottoman-era fortified tower. During the 1947–1949 Palestine war the village of Ze'rin "became a central base for Arab forces", and was therefore conquered and the site cleared.

Archaeology

Archaeologists David Ussishkin and John Woodhead led a dig at Jezreel. In 1987, a bulldozer working near the site accidentally uncovered ancient structures, and a salvage dig was conducted, leading to the major dig under the direction of Ussishkin and Woodhead over seven seasons from 1990 to 1996. Staff and volunteers from about 25 countries (the largest groups were from United Kingdom, Sweden and Denmark) joined the dig.

Renewed excavations began in the summer of 2012 under the new directorship of Dr. Norma Franklin of the University of Haifa Zinman Institute of Archaeology, and Dr. Jennie Ebeling of the University of Evansville. The excavations uncovered a casemate wall and four projecting towers surrounding the fortress, built with a combination of well-cut ashlars, boulders and smaller stones, and an upper level of mud-brick. The fortress enclosed an area of almost .  It was 860' long and 470' wide, and defended by a steep slope to the north and a moat 20' deep and rampart on the other three sides.

Pursuant to evidence from this most recent excavation, Dr. Franklin further asserts that Jezreel likely contained both a vineyard and a winery near an installation made to house any visiting Israelite king, which is all consistent with several claims regarding the story of the vineyard's alleged owner—a man named Naboth—made in the Biblical Book of 1 Kings. While vineyards do not leave direct archaeological remains, an independently conducted soil analysis found a plot of land in Jezreel properly suited for growing grapes, while the soils in the fields further west from the location were found to be the right quality for growing olives. Furthermore, numerous indicators of an ancient winery were discovered at a "particularly impressive installation...carved into the limestone bedrock at the foot of the hill of Jezreel", such indicators including rock-cut treading floors; two adjacent rock-cut vats, each more than one meter in depth; another treading floor connected to a vat by a rock-cut channel; a deep circular basin that possibly functioned as additional vat; and a sump for collecting liquids.

References

Further reading 

 

Archaeological sites in Israel
National parks of Israel
Hebrew Bible cities
Former populated places in Southwest Asia
Bronze Age sites in Israel
Iron Age sites in Israel
Canaanite cities
Tells (archaeology)
Omrides